is a train station in Sasaguri, Kasuya District, Fukuoka Prefecture, Japan.

Lines
The station is sometimes depicted on maps and timetables as part of the Fukuhoku Yutaka Line, of which the Sasaguri Line is a component.

Station layout 
The station, which is unstaffed, consists of a side platform serving a single elevated track. From the main road, a flight of steps leads to a dias. A tall stairwell then gives access to the platform. An automatic ticket vending machine is located at the base of the stairwell. A toilet building is located next to the dias.

Adjacent stations 

History
With the privatization of JNR on 1 April 1987, JR Kyushu took over control of the station.

References

External links
Chikuzen-Yamate (JR Kyushu)

Railway stations in Fukuoka Prefecture
Railway stations in Japan opened in 1968